Contrecoup may refer to:

 Coup contrecoup injury
 Counter-coup